Diana Nyad  (née Sneed; born August 22, 1949) is an American author, journalist, motivational speaker, and long-distance swimmer. Nyad gained national attention in 1975 when she swam around Manhattan and in 1979 when she swam from North Bimini, The Bahamas, to Juno Beach, Florida. In 2013, on her fifth attempt and at age 64, she became the first person claiming to have swum from Cuba to Florida without the aid of a shark cage, swimming from Havana to Key West (110 mi or 177 km) although this has not been formally ratified by any recognised swim body. Nyad was also once ranked thirteenth among US women squash players.

Early life and education
Nyad was born in New York City on August 22, 1949, to stockbroker William L. Sneed Jr. and his wife Lucy Winslow Curtis (1925–2007). Her mother was a great-granddaughter of Charlotte N. Winslow, the inventor of Mrs Winslow's Soothing Syrup, a popular morphine-based medicine for children teething that was manufactured from 1849 until the 1930s. She is also a great-grandniece of women's-rights activist Laura Curtis Bullard.

The Sneeds divorced in 1952, after which Lucy Sneed married Aristotle Z. Nyad, a Greek-Egyptian land developer, who adopted Diana. The family moved to Fort Lauderdale, Florida, where she began swimming seriously in seventh grade.

She was enrolled at the private Pine Crest School in the mid-1960s, swimming under the tutelage of Olympian and Hall of Fame coach Jack Nelson who, she has said, molested her beginning when she was fourteen years old and continuing until she graduated from high school, as he did with other girls he coached.    She won three Florida state high school championships in the Backstroke at 100 and 200 yards (91 and 183 m). She dreamed of swimming in the 1968 Summer Olympics, but in 1966 she spent three months in bed with endocarditis, an infection of the heart, and when she began swimming again she had lost speed.

After graduating from Pine Crest School in 1967, she entered Emory University, but was eventually expelled for jumping out a fourth-floor dormitory window wearing a parachute. She then enrolled at Lake Forest College in Illinois, where she played tennis for the Foresters and resumed swimming, concentrating on distance events. She soon came to the attention of Buck Dawson, director of the International Swimming Hall of Fame in Florida, who introduced her to marathon swimming. She began training at his Camp Ak-O-Mak in Magnetawan, Ontario, Canada and set a women's world record of 4 hours and 22 minutes in her first race, a 10-mile (16 km) swim in Lake Ontario in July 1970, finishing 10th overall. After graduating from Lake Forest College in 1973, with a degree in English and French, Nyad returned to south Florida to continue training with Dawson.

Career
Nyad has written four books: Other Shores (Random House: September 1978) about her life and distance swimming, Basic Training for Women (Harmony Books: 1981), Boss of Me: The Keyshawn Johnson Story (1999) about an NFL wide receiver, and Find a Way: One Wild and Precious Life (Knopf Publishing Group: 2015). She has also written for The New York Times, NPR's "All Things Considered," Newsweek magazine, and other publications. Diana and her best friend Bonnie Stoll (former No. 3 in the world on the Pro Racquetball Tour) have formed a company called BravaBody which is aimed at providing online exercise advice to women over 40, with the two world-class athletes giving direct inspiration and custom-made work-outs.  As of 2006, she also delivered motivational talks to groups through the Gold Star speakers agency, for a fee of between $10,000 to $15,000.

Nyad formerly hosted the public radio program "The Savvy Traveler." In addition, she was the subject of a short documentary "Diana" by the digital channel WIGS in 2012. As of 2006, she was a (long-time) weekly contributor to National Public Radio's afternoon news show All Things Considered (appearing on Thursdays), as well as the "business of sport" commentator for American Public Media's public radio program Marketplace business news. She was also a regular contributor to the CBS News television show Sunday Morning.
In her 1978 autobiography, Nyad described marathon swimming as a battle for survival against a brutal foe—the sea—and the only victory possible is to "touch the other shore."

An analysis of Nyad's ability to dissociate during her marathon swims is covered by James W. Pipkin.

An independently produced documentary film, The Other Shore, was released in early 2013, some months before Nyad's first successful swim from Cuba to Florida.

Distance swimming
Over two days in 1979, Nyad swam from Bimini to Florida, setting a distance record for non-stop swimming without a wetsuit that still stands today. She broke numerous world records, including the 45-year-old mark for circling Manhattan Island (7 hrs, 57 min) in 1975.

 1974: In June 1974, Nyad set a women's record of 8 hours, 11 minutes in the 22-mile (35 km) Bay of Naples race.
 1975: At age 26, Nyad made national headlines by swimming  around the island of Manhattan (New York City) in just under 8 hours (7 hours 57 minutes.)
 1978: At age 28 she first attempted to swim from Havana, Cuba to Key West, one year after the Kennedy-era travel restrictions were lifted. Diving into the ocean at 2PM on Sunday, August 13 from Ortegosa Beach ( west of Havana), she swam inside a  steel shark cage for nearly 42 hours, before team doctors removed her during the 7 o'clock hour on the morning of Tuesday, August 15 due to strong Westerly winds and  swells that were slamming her against the cage and pushing her off-course towards Texas.
 1979: On her 30th birthday (August 21–22, 1979), in what was to be her last "competitive" swim, she set a world record for distance swimming (both men and women) over open water by swimming  from North Bimini Island, Bahamas, to Juno Beach, Florida (without the use of protective shark cage). Thanks to favorable winds and a following sea she averaged  and completed the swim in 27 and one-half hours.

Several experts who attended the 2011 Global Open Water Swimming Conference in New York City on June 17–19, 2011 expressed their strong belief that Nyad had both the physical ability and, more importantly, the positive mental stamina to be able to complete the Cuba-to-Florida swim: sports physiology studies have shown that in "extreme" marathon-type activities mental determination is a more important factor than the physical energy of youth.

Cuba to Florida swim attempts in 2011–2013

Preparations
By early January 2010 Nyad began training for a summer attempt to swim from Cuba to Florida. Taking up residence in the Caribbean island of St. Maarten, from January through June, she would go for 8-, 10-, 12-, and 14-hour-long swims every other week. She then moved her training to Key West and, while waiting for favorable weather conditions, she embarked on a 24-hour swim. On July 10, she reserved a 35-foot fishing vessel to take her  out to sea. At 8:19 AM she jumped overboard and began swimming back towards Key West, with the boat following her.

On July 10, 2010, at the age of 60, she began open water training in preparation for a 60-hour, 103-mile (166 km) swim from Cuba to Florida, a task she had failed to accomplish thirty years prior. When asked about her motivation, she answered, "Because I'd like to prove to the other 60 year-olds that it is never too late to start your dreams." She was scheduled to make the swim in August/September 2010, but bad weather forced her to cancel; she rescheduled for July 2011. In an October 15, 2010 interview with CNN, Nyad said she was trained and ready to swim by July 23, but a record stretch of high winds and dropping water temperatures prevented her from making the attempt.

While training in St. Maarten, she sat for an interview that was published March 25, 2011 by the island's online news agency, The Daily Herald, remarking that "It's a large operation, like an expedition. We've got about 25 people, navigators, managers, boat crew, weather routers, medical people, shark experts, you name it. That's the time also when the water starts to get to its hottest. I need the hottest possible ocean. As soon as we hit the right forecast, we'll be off to Havana. We won't know the exact starting point probably until the night before. And we don't know exactly where landfall will be...I'd love to wind up in Key West, but it will depend on trajectory of the Gulf Stream." Nyad estimated that the cost of her "expedition" was about $500,000.

Nyad moved her training site from the Caribbean island of St. Maarten to Key West, Florida, in June 2011. She was joined by key members of her support team on June 28, to wait for ideal weather conditions that typically occur only during the summer doldrums in July and August. For the marathon swim to be feasible, two main weather conditions needed to come together at the same time: a combination of low-to-light winds (to minimize sea chop), and water temperatures in the high 80s °F (high 20s/low 30s °C). These relatively "high" water temperatures produce a twin challenge: in the first half of her swim the warm water will dehydrate her body, while in the second half her body temperature will drop and she will face potential hypothermia. Nyad had bulked up her physique to about 150 pounds/70 kg (15 pounds/7 kg more than she weighed in 2010) to help counter the loss of body mass during her grueling swim.

Nyad was escorted by a paddler in a kayak equipped with an electronic shark repellent known as a Shark Shield.

To keep Nyad swimming in a straight line, her specially designed, slow-moving catamaran support boat deployed a  streamer: a long pole keeps the streamer several yards away from the boat, and the streamer is designed to remain about 5 feet underwater, so that Nyad can swim above it, much like following a lane line in a swimming pool. At night, the white streamer was replaced by a string of red LED lights. Writing in her blog in July 2011, Nyad stated that the development of the submerged guide streamer, in early summer 2011, may be the single greatest aid to her marathon swim. In all of her previous swims, she had trouble keeping the support boat in sight and was prone to veer off-course. Keeping a boat headed in a straight line, in the ocean, while moving at only 1 to 2 knots is very difficult, and her catamaran is equipped with thrusters and a special sea anchor (in case of following seas) to stabilize its course.

Second attempt
Some 33 years after her first attempt in 1978, Nyad entered the water again at Havana on August 7, 2011 at 7:45PM, a CNN news team on board her support ship to provide live coverage of her swim, which involved electronic "Shark Shields" but no shark cage. Nyad stopped her attempt early in the morning on August 9 at 12:45AM after 29 hours in the water, after encountering strong currents and winds that pushed her miles off course to the east. Nyad also said she had been suffering shoulder pain since her third hour in the water, but what made her abandon the effort was a flare-up of her asthma, such that, throughout the final hour, she could only swim a few strokes before repeatedly having to roll on her back to catch her breath.

Third attempt
On September 23, 2011, Diana Nyad began a third attempt at the Cuba-to-Florida swim, again without a shark cage, but had to stop after about 41 hours, about  through the  passage, because of jellyfish and Portuguese man-of-war stings and after currents pushed her off course. Nyad's October 2011 TED talk described how box jellyfish stings on her forearm and neck caused respiratory distress that eventually caused the swim to end.

Fourth attempt
On August 18, 2012, Nyad began her fourth attempt, without a protective shark cage. Nyad and her team ended the swim prematurely at 12:55 a.m. on August 21, 2012, reportedly because of two storms and nine jellyfish stings, after having covered more distance than her three previous attempts.

Fifth attempt
At approximately 1:55 pm EDT on September 2, 2013, Nyad reached the beach in Key West, about 53 hours after she began her journey.

While not directly questioning the authenticity of her story, some skeptics, including long-distance swimmers, requested the swim's GPS history, surface current, weather, and Nyad's eating and drinking data. The swim's published GPS data was analyzed and graphed on September 8 by The New York Times. After Nyad's September 10 response to questions and her publishing path data and notes from her navigator and two observers, a University of Miami oceanography professor, Tamay Ozgokmen, confirmed the navigator's assertion that favorable Gulf Stream currents explained Nyad's apparently incredible total velocity during certain portions of the swim. The New York Times public editor observed on September 19 that the focus had shifted from serious questions about possibly resting aboard a boat, to more technical issues relating to whether her crews' touching her while helping with her protective suit formally rendered the swim an "assisted" swim. Nyad had explained that wearing the jellyfish-protection suit was a life-and-death measure that for her superseded the previous "traditions" of the sport. On September 12, 2013, Nyad said she would "wait and see" if the swim would be officially ratified. As of 2022, the swim has not been ratified by any marathon swimming governing body.

On September 10, 2013, Nyad appeared on The Ellen DeGeneres Show. She explained that she started her training in the Caribbean in January 2013 with 12-hour workouts of nonstop swimming and eventually worked up to 14, 18, 20, and 24 hours. Nyad also said that while she swims she remembers Stephen Hawking books, sings, counts numbers and has vivid hallucinations of The Wizard of Oz and the yellow brick road.

Dancing with the Stars performances
On March 4, 2014, Nyad was announced as one of the celebrities to compete on the 18th season of Dancing with the Stars, in which she finished in last place. She was partnered with professional dancer Henry Byalikov.

Other media appearances
In 1989, Nyad was a guest correspondent on an episode of Unsolved Mysteries about Alcatraz. She assisted on a segment that detailed real-life, current reenactments of both kayakers and a swimmer attempting to traverse San Francisco Bay.

Nyad appeared in the Macy Gray music video for the song “Bang, Bang” in 2014.

Also in 2014, Nyad performed in her solo show (which she had also written) called ONWARD – The Diana Nyad story, which premiered that year at the NoHo Arts Centre Theater in Los Angeles, directed by Josh Ravetch.

Honors, awards and distinctions
Nyad was inducted into the United States National Women's Sports Hall of Fame in 1986. She is also an International Marathon Swimming Hall of Fame Honoree (1978) and an ISHOF Al Schoenfield Media Award recipient (2002). She is a Hall of Famer at her college, Lake Forest College in Illinois, and at her high school, Pine Crest School in Fort Lauderdale.

2014
 Nyad was awarded the first ESPN Sports Science Newton Award for Outstanding New Limit.
 Nyad was awarded the L.A. Sports Council's Athlete of the Year award.
 She was inducted into the National Gay and Lesbian Sports Hall of Fame.
 Nyad received the Jack LaLanne Award.
 She received the "Orden al Mérito Deportivo" [Order of Sporting Merit] Award, from Cuba.
 A bronze plaque honoring Nyad was unveiled on a concrete wall bordering Smathers Beach, where she ended her successful Cuba to Florida swim.
 Nyad was named one of National Geographic’s Adventurers of the Year.

2015
 Nyad was shown in Marie Claire magazine's "The 8 Greatest Moments for Women in Sports."
 The book The Right Side of History: 100 Years of LGBTQ Activism by Adrian Brooks, was published; chapter 30 of the book, by Rita Mae Brown, was titled and was about Diana Nyad.

Personal life
Nyad has said a factor in her determination while swimming was her anger about, and her desire to overcome sexual abuse she experienced as a child. Nyad has spoken publicly about this issue. Most recently, she candidly described this painful part of her life and her struggle to overcome the pain in an article in The New York Times. Nyad is openly lesbian and is an atheist.

Charitable activities
From October 8–10, 2013, Nyad participated in "Swim for Relief" by doing a 48-hour continuous swim in New York City's Herald Square in a specially constructed, 120-foot long, two lane pool. It raised $105,001.00 for AmeriCares to benefit the victims of Hurricane Sandy.

References

External links

 
 Official bio on American Public Media
 Nyad's December 2013 TED Talk "Never, ever give up " after having completed the Cuba-to-Florida swim in September
 "An Ill Wind That Blew No Good" —Sports Illustrated, August 28, 1978
 1978 Nyad interview with John Calloway after her first Cuba-Florida attempt, Chicago Tonight, full video
 

1949 births
20th-century American non-fiction writers
20th-century American women writers
21st-century American non-fiction writers
21st-century American women writers
American atheists
American female swimmers
American long-distance swimmers
American motivational speakers
Women motivational speakers
American Public Media
American female squash players
American women journalists
Emory University alumni
Lake Forest College alumni
Lesbian sportswomen
American lesbian writers
American LGBT journalists
LGBT people from New York (state)
American LGBT sportspeople
LGBT swimmers
Living people
NFL Europe broadcasters
Sportspeople from New York City
Sportswriters from New York (state)
Writers from New York City
LGBT squash players
Manhattan Island swimmers
Olympic Games broadcasters
21st-century American LGBT people
Pine Crest School alumni